The South Orange Fire Department, is located in South Orange, Essex County, New Jersey, United States. The building was built in 1926 under the direction of architects, Arthur Dillon and Henry L Beadel. The building was added to the National Register of Historic Places on June 22, 1998. The building serves as the headquarters for the South Orange Fire Department. On April 22, 2002, the South Orange Fire Headquarters was closed due to the presence of asbestos throughout the structure. The building was renovated and reopened several years later.

See also
National Register of Historic Places listings in Essex County, New Jersey

References

External links

Fire stations completed in 1926
Fire stations on the National Register of Historic Places in New Jersey
South Orange, New Jersey
Defunct fire stations in New Jersey
Buildings and structures in Essex County, New Jersey
National Register of Historic Places in Essex County, New Jersey
New Jersey Register of Historic Places